Sikta mot stjärnorna (in English: Aiming for the stars) is a Swedish singing talent show that was broadcast on TV4 between 1994 until 2002. The show featured people acting and imitating their favorite singers/bands performances. From the 1996 season and forward the show worked as the Swedish pre-selection for the European final called European Soundmix Show. Several of Sweden's most known singers performed on the show before launching their singing careers.

References

Singing talent shows
Swedish music television series
TV4 (Sweden) original programming
1994 Swedish television series debuts
2002 Swedish television series endings
1990s Swedish television series